The following is a list of the members of the 18th Knesset, elected on 10 February 2009.

Knesset members

Replacements

See also
List of Likud Knesset members
Arab members of the Knesset

References

External links
Current Knesset Members of the Eighteenth Knesset Knesset website

 
18